Jan Hendriks (6 December 1928 – 13 December 1991) was a German film actor. He appeared in more than 80 films on screen and TV between 1950 and 1985. In 1952 he won the German Film Award as Best Male Newcomer. Between 1977–1985 he co-starred in the TV-crime-serial The Old Fox. He died in Berlin, Germany, aged 63.

Selected filmography

 Der Engel mit dem Saitenspiel (1944) - Minor Role (uncredited)
 The Green Salon (1944) - Minor Role (uncredited)
 Anna Alt (1945) - Minor Role (uncredited)
 The Big Lift (1950) - Minor Role (uncredited)
 Dark Eyes (1951) - Jan Krapp
 The Sinful Border (1951) - Laszlo
 The Sergeant's Daughter (1952) - Leutnant Christian von Lauffen
 Queen of the Arena (1952) - Tonio, Artist
 Wedding Bells (1954) - Philip Harding
 The Angel with the Flaming Sword (1954) - Freddy
 Heimweh nach Deutschland (1954) - Erik Olsen
 Homesick for Germany (1954) - Dr. Michelsen
 The Barrings (1955) - Graf Wilda
 Alibi (1955) - Berthold
 Magic Fire (1956) - Michael Bakunin
 My Brother Joshua (1956) - Hans Donath, beider Sohn
 Der Bauerndoktor von Bayrischzell (1957) - Stephan Doppelsieder - Sohn
 Spielbank-Affäre (1957) - Gerhard
  (1957) - Toni Moosbacher
 The Green Devils of Monte Cassino (1958) - Fausto
 Das verbotene Paradies (1958) - Dr. Theo Krailing
 Arms and the Man (1958, AAN) - Leutnant Sergius Slivitzna
  (1958) - Paul
 Bobby Dodd greift ein (1959)
 Arzt aus Leidenschaft (1959) - Felix Friedberg
 Love Now, Pay Later (1959) - Heinz Pohlmann, ein Freund
 Paradise for Sailors (1959) - Henry F. Jones
 The Juvenile Judge (1960) - Dr. Holzer (uncredited)
 The High Life (1960) - Le neveu
 Brainwashed (1960) - First Officer
 Flitterwochen in der Hölle (1960) - Mario Bertelli
 Mal drunter – mal drüber (1960) - Manfred
 Island of the Amazons (1960) - Murdok
 The Devil's Daffodil (1961) - Charles
 Murder Party (1961) - Dahlberg (voice, uncredited)
 Immer wenn es Nacht wird (1961) - Bobby Elkins
 The Door with Seven Locks (1962) - Tom Cawler
 The Inn on the River (1962) - Roger Lane
 Stahlnetz:  (1962, TV series episode) - Roger Lane
 The Squeaker (1963) - Thomas Leslie
 Mit besten Empfehlungen (1963) - Muppilein, ihr Verlobter
  (1964, TV series) - Kellner Ian
 Waiting Room to the Beyond (1964) - Carlos
 Buffalo Bill, Hero of the Far West (1965) - Monroe
 Duel at Sundown (1965) - Lord
 The Monk with the Whip (1967) - Brent
 Non sta bene rubare il tesoro (1967) - Da Costa
  (1967, TV miniseries) - Dan Low
 Im Schloß der blutigen Begierde (1968) - Georg v. Kassell
  (1968, TV miniseries) - Bleriot
 Rebus (1969) - Manager of the Playboy Club
 The Man with the Glass Eye (1969) - Rubiro
  (1969, TV film) - Legrand
 Heintje – Einmal wird die Sonne wieder scheinen (1970) - Willi
 Guns of War (Uzicka Republika)  (1974) - Nemacki major
 Derrick (1975-1976, TV series) - Barkeeper / Schlott / Dreyer
 The Old Fox (1977–1986, TV series) - Polizeiinspektor Martin Brenner (final appearance)
 Alcaptar (1978) - Soldat
 Ein gutes Land (1982)

References

External links

1928 births
1991 deaths
German male film actors
German male television actors
Male actors from Berlin
20th-century German male actors